West High Street Historic District may refer to:

 West High Street Historic District (Lexington, Kentucky), formerly listed on the NRHP in Kentucky
 West High Street Historic District (High Point, North Carolina), listed on the NRHP in North Carolina